The muscular lacuna (Latin: lacuna musculorum) is the lateral compartment of the thigh inferior to the inguinal ligament, for the passage of the iliopsoas muscle, the femoral nerve and the lateral cutaneous nerve of the thigh; it is separated by the iliopectineal arch from the vascular lacuna.

Muscular system